The Lower Saxon Asparagus Road is a tourist route in North Germany that confers recognition of the asparagus as a delicacy in the region. The vegetable is grown in the areas between  Brunswick and Lüneburg, between Bremen, Cloppenburg and Vechta, and from Nienburg/Weser via Hoya to Soltau.

It was initiated by the Lower Saxon Asparagus Road Society (Verein Niedersächsische Spargelstraße) and is the equivalent of the German Wine Road, the Lower Saxon Mill Road or the German Fairy Tale Route.

Part of the Lower Saxon Asparagus Road runs from Burgdorf via Nienburg/Weser, Bruchhausen-Vilsen and Bassum to Sulingen. Since 2005 the Lower Saxon Asparagus Museum (Niedersächsische Spargelmuseum) has been located in Nienburg.

Other asparagus roads 
In Baden-Württemberg (Baden Asparagus Road) and in North Rhine-Westphalia there are other asparagus roads.

Sources 
 Dieter Hurcks: Entlang der Niedersächsischen Spargelstraße.

See also
Straße der Megalithkultur - tourist route from Osnabrück to Oldenburg via some 33 Megalithic sites.

External links 
 Lower Saxon Asparagus Road 
 The Lower Saxon Asparagus Road 
 Asparagus book 
 Nienburg Asparagus Museum 

German tourist routes
Oldenburg Münsterland
Roads in Lower Saxony
Tourist attractions in Lower Saxony
Tourist attractions in Hesse